The 1948 Wichita Shockers football team, sometimes known as the Wheatshockers, was an American football team that represented Wichita  University (now known as Wichita State University) as a member of the Missouri Valley Conference during the 1948 college football season. In its first season under head coach Jim Trimble, the team compiled a 5–4–1 record (2–1–1 against conference opponents), finished second out of five teams in the MVC, lost to Hardin–Simmons in the Camellia Bowl, and was outscored by a total of 234 to 196. The team played its home games at Veterans Field, now known as Cessna Stadium.

Schedule

References

Wichita
Wichita State Shockers football seasons
Wichita Shockers football